Jennifer Mudie (born 13 January 1984) is a former Scottish international cricketer whose career for the Scottish national side spanned from 2003 to 2005. She had played 3 women's one-day internationals

References

External links

1984 births
Living people
Scotland women One Day International cricketers
Scottish women cricketers
People from Forfar
Sportspeople from Angus, Scotland